Carthamus creticus is a plant species in the family Asteraceae, related to safflower.

It is native to the Mediterranean region including Europe (Spain, Portugal, France, Britain, Italy, Greece, Malta, Serbia, Bosnia, etc.), North Africa (Morocco, Algeria, Libya) and southwestern Asia (Turkey, Palestine, Cyprus). It is also naturalized in New Zealand and California.

References

creticus
Flora of Europe